The Alpine Alpenglow is a hydrogen-powered concept car from French automaker Alpine presented in October 2022, during the 2022 Paris Motor Show.

In 2024, an LMDh prototype will take the start of the 24 Hours of Le Mans.

References

External links
 Official website (United Kingdom)

Alpenglow
Sports cars